Firmin Ndombe Mubele is a Congolese professional footballer who plays for the Democratic Republic of the Congo national football team. He plays as a winger, while also being capable of filling the role of a striker.

Club career
In March 2013, Mubele scored a hat-trick for Vita Club in the 2014 CAF Champions League game against Kaizer Chiefs F.C.

He joined Qatari club Al Ahli in July 2015.

He was transferred to Ligue 1 side Stade Rennais F.C. on 30 January 2017.

On 2 July 2019, FC Astana announced the signing of Mubele on a one-year loan deal from Toulouse.

International career
Mubele was called up for the under 20 age group 2013 Toulon Tournament.

Mubele made his international début for the Democratic Republic of the Congo in 2013. Mubele was involved in DR Congo's unsuccessful campaign to qualify for the 2014 FIFA World Cup, playing in games against Libya and Cameroon.

He was named in the 2014 African Nations Championship squad and played in four games.

International goals
Scores and results list DR Congo's goal tally first, score column indicates score after each Mubele goal.

Honors
DR Congo
Africa Cup of Nations bronze: 2015

References

External links
 
 

1994 births
Living people
Footballers from Kinshasa
Association football forwards
Democratic Republic of the Congo footballers
Democratic Republic of the Congo international footballers
2015 Africa Cup of Nations players
2017 Africa Cup of Nations players
Qatar Stars League players
Ligue 1 players
Championnat National 3 players
Kazakhstan Premier League players
Al Ahli SC (Doha) players
Stade Rennais F.C. players
Toulouse FC players
FC Astana players
Liga II players
CSC 1599 Șelimbăr players
Democratic Republic of the Congo expatriate footballers
Democratic Republic of the Congo expatriate sportspeople in France
Democratic Republic of the Congo expatriate sportspeople in Kazakhstan
Democratic Republic of the Congo expatriate sportspeople in Romania
Expatriate footballers in Qatar
Expatriate footballers in France
Expatriate footballers in Kazakhstan
Expatriate footballers in Romania